Frédéric Chaves d'Aguilar (8 October 1918 – 18 December 2004) was a Belgian international footballer who played as a striker for a number of Belgian club sides including La Gantoise, KSV Waregem, KV Kortrijk and KRC Gent-Zeehaven. Chaves also scored 8 goals in 20 appearances for the Belgian national side.

Managerial career
Chaves later became a football manager, and coached KSV Waregem and KV Kortrijk

External links
 
 

1918 births
2004 deaths
Footballers from Ghent
Association football forwards
Belgian footballers
Belgium international footballers
K.A.A. Gent players
K.S.V. Waregem players
K.V. Kortrijk players
Belgian football managers
K.S.V. Waregem managers
K.V. Kortrijk managers
K.R.C. Gent players